The Jekyll and Hyde Tour (stylized as the Jekyll + Hyde Tour) was the fifth headlining concert tour by American country music group the Zac Brown Band, in support of their fourth studio album Jekyll + Hyde (2015). The tour began on May 1, 2015 in Nashville, Tennessee and finished on December 11 that year in Grand Rapids, Michigan. This was the sixteenth ranked tour of 2015 and grossed $45.2 million in revenue.

Background
Zac Brown Band announced the tour in March 2015. Nine of the shows will take place at baseball parks including historic stadiums such as Fenway Park and Wrigley Field. A London date was announced in May 2015.
$1 from every ticket sold goes to Brown's "Camp Southern Ground", a camp that gives kids "including those with social and emotional problems, a chance to go away to camp."

Concert synopsis and production
The shows last for two and a half hours, and the stage is a three-story tier, and LED screens. The band played twenty-six numbers including most of the tracks off Jekyll + Hyde, past favorites, and covers of "Kashmir (song)" by Led Zeppelin, "Let It Be" by The Beatles, "Bohemian Rhapsody" by Queen, "Under the Bridge" by the Red Hot Chili Peppers and "Enter Sandman" by Metallica. Not only are there country music elements in the show but there is also EDM, rock and pop. At the end of "Dress Blues" the video screen shows a flag-folding ceremony for a veteran. Photos of "Camp Southern Ground" is displayed on the screens during "Remedy" During "Junkyard" a fifteen-foot dragon controlled by the leg work of the band, wound its way around the stage.

The kickoff show in Nashville had guest appearances from, Jewel, Kid Rock, Béla Fleck and Drake White.

Opening acts

Gregg Allman
The Avett Brothers
Big Head Todd & The Monsters
Jason Isbell
Muddy Magnolias 
Elliot Root
Marc Scibilia
Drake White

Setlist
"Homegrown"
"Knee Deep"
"One Day"
"Remedy" 
"As She's Walking Away" 
"Dress Blues"
"Mango Tree"
"Young and Wild"
"Castaway"
"Sweet Annie"
"Love the One You're With"
"Let It Be" 
"I'll Be Your Man (Song for a Daughter)"
"Colder Weather"
"Keep Me in Mind"
"Wildfire"
"Bittersweet"
"Toes"
"Day for the Dead"
"Bohemian Rhapsody" 
"Lovin' You Easy"
"Free"/"Into the Mystic"
"Beautiful Drug"
"Chicken Fried"
Encore
"Junkyard"
"Tomorrow Never Comes"

Source:

Tour dates

List of festivals
 This concert was a part of the Hangout Music Festival
 This concert was a part of CMA Music Festival
 This concert was a part of the Florida Country SuperFest
 This concert was a part of Summerfest.

Cancelled Shows

Band
Zac Brown — Lead vocals, guitar
Jimmy De Martini — Backing vocals, fiddle
John Driskell Hopkins — Backing vocals, guitar, baritone guitar, upright bass, banjo
Coy Bowles — Clavinet, guitar, Hammond organ, Wurlitzer electric piano
Chris Fryar — Drums, Percussion
Clay Cook — Backing vocals, clavinet, guitar, Hammond organ, pedal steel guitar
Daniel De Los Reyes — Percussion 
Matt Mangano — Bass guitar

Critical reception
Adam Gold of Rolling Stone wrote that "Brown and his band" "never shy away from taking risks and don't back down from broadening an already exceedingly eclectic sonic palette." With all the new tricks up Zac Brown Band's sleeve, Gold felt like Brown "wasn't fully convinced" that they "were working yet."

References

2015 concert tours
2016 concert tours
Zac Brown Band concert tours